Middle East University is a non-profit, institution of higher learning located in Beirut, Lebanon. The campus is located in the Beirut suburb of Sabtieh, on the outskirts of the city. It is affiliated with and operated by the Seventh-day Adventist Church and is part of the worldwide network of colleges and universities.

History
Founded as the Adventist College of Beirut and located in Mouseitbeh, in 1946 the institution was relocated to its present location, east of Beirut in Sabtieh, Sad El-Bauchrieh. During the same year it was renamed Middle East College and the cornerstone of what is now North Hall was laid by Sheikh Bechara El Khoury, the then President of the Republic of Lebanon. 

On June 28, 2001, Middle East College was formally and legally renamed Middle East University.

Academic programs
The university has four faculties:
 Faculty of Arts and Sciences
 Faculty of Business Administration
 Faculty of Education
 Faculty of Philosophy and Theology

Middle East University offers programs that lead to both undergraduate and graduate degrees. Classes are taught in English. The Arabic Language Institute and the English Language Institute offer intensive courses to non-native speakers as well.

See also

 List of Seventh-day Adventist colleges and universities
 Seventh-day Adventist education

References

External links 
 MEU Official Website

Universities and colleges affiliated with the Seventh-day Adventist Church
Education in the Middle East
Educational institutions established in 1939
Universities in Lebanon
1939 establishments in Lebanon